John Blake Dillon (5 May 1814 – 15 September 1866) was an Irish writer and politician who was one of the founding members of the Young Ireland movement.

John Blake Dillon was born in the town of Ballaghaderreen, on the border of counties Mayo and Roscommon. He was a son of Anne Blake and her husband Luke Dillon (d. 1826), who had been a land agent for his cousin Patrick Dillon, 11th Earl of Roscommon. His niece was Anne Deane, who helped to raise his family after his death.

He was educated at St. Patrick's College, Maynooth, leaving after only two years there, having decided that he was not meant for the priesthood. He later studied law at Trinity College, Dublin (TCD), and in London, before being called to the Irish Bar.

It was during his time at TCD that he first met and befriended Thomas Davis.

While working for The Morning Register newspaper he met Charles Gavan Duffy, with whom he and Davis founded The Nation in 1842, which was dedicated to promoting Irish nationalism and all three men became important members of Daniel O'Connell's Repeal Association, which advocated the repeal of the Act of Union 1800 between Great Britain and Ireland.

The young wing of the party, of which they were key members with William Smith O'Brien and Thomas Francis Meagher, came to be known as Young Ireland and advocated the threat of force to achieve repeal of the Act of Union. This was in contrast to the committed pacifism of O'Connell's "Old Ireland" wing. This posturing eventually led to the Young Ireland rebellion of 1848 where a countryside devastated by the Great Famine failed to rise up and support the rebels.

According to fellow Irish nationalist, Justin McCarthy:

"...it has been said of him that while he strongly discouraged the idea of armed rebellion, and had no faith in the possibility of Ireland's succeeding by any movement of insurrection, yet when Smith O'Brien risked Ireland's chances in the open field, he cast his lot with his leader and stood by his side in Tipperary."

After the failure of Young Ireland's uprising, Dillon fled Ireland, escaping first to France and, eventually, to the United States, where he served the New York Bar.

Dillon returned to Ireland on amnesty in 1855 and in 1865 was elected as a Member of Parliament for Tipperary. By now he advocated a Federal union of Britain and Ireland and denounced the violent methods advocated by the Irish Republican Brotherhood or Fenian movement.

John Blake Dillon died of cholera in Killiney, Co. Dublin, aged 52, and is buried in Glasnevin Cemetery, Dublin.

He was the father of John Dillon, and grandfather of James Dillon.

References

Further reading
The Politics of Irish Literature: from Thomas Davis to W.B. Yeats, Malcolm Brown, Allen &  Unwin, 1973.
John Mitchel, A Cause Too Many,	Aidan Hegarty,	Camlane Press.
Thomas Davis, The Thinker and Teacher,	Arthur Griffith, M.H. Gill & Son 1922.
Brigadier-General Thomas Francis Meagher His Political and Military Career, Capt. W. F. Lyons, Burns Oates & Washbourne Limited 1869
Young Ireland and 1848,	Dennis Gwynn,	Cork University Press 1949.
Daniel O'Connell The Irish Liberator,	Dennis Gwynn,	Hutchinson & Co, Ltd.
O'Connell Davis and the Colleges Bill,	Dennis Gwynn,	Cork University Press 1948.
Smith O’Brien And The "Secession", Dennis Gwynn, Cork University Press
Meagher of The Sword,	Edited By Arthur Griffith,	M. H. Gill & Son, Ltd. 1916.
Young Irelander Abroad The Diary of Charles Hart, Edited by Brendan O'Cathaoir,	University Press.
John Mitchel First Felon for Ireland, Edited By Brian O'Higgins, Brian O'Higgins 1947.
Rossa's Recollections 1838 to 1898, Intro by Sean O'Luing, The Lyons Press 2004.
Labour in Ireland, James Connolly, Fleet Street 1910.
The Re-Conquest of Ireland, James Connolly,	Fleet Street 1915.
John Mitchel Noted Irish Lives, Louis J. Walsh,	The Talbot Press Ltd 1934.
Thomas Davis: Essays and Poems, Centenary Memoir, M. H Gill, M.H. Gill & Son, Ltd MCMXLV.
Life of John Martin,	P. A. Sillard,	James Duffy & Co., Ltd 1901.
Life of John Mitchel,	P. A. Sillard,	James Duffy and Co., Ltd 1908.
John Mitchel,	P. S. O'Hegarty, Maunsel & Company, Ltd 1917.
The Fenians in Context Irish Politics & Society 1848–82, R. V. Comerford, Wolfhound Press 1998
William Smith O'Brien and the Young Ireland Rebellion of 1848,	Robert Sloan, Four Courts Press 2000
Irish Mitchel,	Seamus MacCall,	Thomas Nelson and Sons Ltd 1938.
Ireland Her Own, T. A. Jackson,	Lawrence & Wishart Ltd 1976.
Life and Times of Daniel O'Connell,	T. C. Luby,	Cameron & Ferguson.
Young Ireland,	T. F. O'Sullivan, The Kerryman Ltd. 1945.
Irish Rebel John Devoy and America's Fight for Irish Freedom, Terry Golway, St. Martin's Griffin 1998.
Paddy's Lament Ireland 1846-1847 Prelude to Hatred,  Thomas Gallagher,	Poolbeg 1994.
The Great Shame, Thomas Keneally, Anchor Books 1999.
James Fintan Lalor, Thomas, P. O'Neill, Golden Publications 2003.
Charles Gavan Duffy: Conversations With Carlyle (1892), with Introduction, Stray Thoughts On Young Ireland, by Brendan Clifford, Athol Books, Belfast, . (Pg. 32 Titled, Foster's account Of Young Ireland.)
Envoi, Taking Leave Of Roy Foster, by Brendan Clifford and Julianne Herlihy, Aubane Historical Society, Cork.
The Falcon Family, or, Young Ireland, by M. W. Savage, London, 1845. (An Gorta Mor)Quinnipiac University

External links 
 

    
    
    

1814 births
1866 deaths
Alumni of Trinity College Dublin
Burials at Glasnevin Cemetery
Deaths from cholera
Members of the Parliament of the United Kingdom for County Tipperary constituencies (1801–1922)
Politicians from County Roscommon
Politicians from County Mayo
UK MPs 1865–1868
Young Irelanders
Infectious disease deaths in Ireland
Irish newspaper founders
19th-century Irish businesspeople